China competed in the 1990 Asian Games as host nation which were held in Beijing, China from September 22, 1990 to October 7, 1990.

See also
 China at the Asian Games
 China at the Olympics
 Sport in China

Nations at the 1990 Asian Games
1990
Asian Games